Wu Xianghu (吴湘湖; c. 1964 – February 2, 2006) was a Chinese journalist who became the editor of the Taizhou Evening News or Taizhou Wanbao before being severely beaten by traffic police in 2005. This led to his death in February 2006. 

On October 19, 2005, Xianghu published an article critical of local traffic police over what he claimed was exorbitant electric bicycle fees. Dozens of local police raided the office of the newspaper where they assaulted Xianghu after he failed to apologise for the article. Senior police officer Li Xiaoguo was sacked at the time for his role in the incident according to Chinese media.

The watchdog group Committee to Protect Journalists reported that Xianghu died of liver and kidney failure. The Committee has claimed that Chinese media failed to report his death despite reporting on the incident in October 2005.

As of February 2005, no-one had been charged in connection with the assault on Xianghu.

References
 "Journalist dies amid continuing crackdown on the press" - IFEX, 7 February 2006
 "Traffic Police Chief storms newspaper office after critical report published" Press Interpreter translation, 21 October 2005, retrieved 7 February 2006
"China editor dies after beating by traffic police group" Reuters UK

1964 births
2006 deaths
Deaths from kidney failure
Assassinated Chinese journalists